Anne Boleyn (1501 or 1507 – 19 May 1536) was Queen of England from 1533 to 1536, as the second wife of King Henry VIII. The circumstances of her marriage and of her execution by beheading for treason and other charges made her a key figure in the political and religious upheaval that marked the start of the English Reformation. Anne was the daughter of Thomas Boleyn, 1st Earl of Wiltshire, and his wife, Elizabeth Howard, and was educated in the Netherlands and France, largely as a maid of honour to Queen Claude of France. Anne returned to England in early 1522, to marry her Irish cousin James Butler, 9th Earl of Ormond; the marriage plans were broken off, and instead, she secured a post at court as maid of honour to Henry VIII's wife, Catherine of Aragon.

Early in 1523, Anne was secretly betrothed to Henry Percy, son of Henry Percy, 5th Earl of Northumberland, but the betrothal was broken off when the Earl refused to support their engagement. Cardinal Thomas Wolsey refused the match in January 1524 and Anne was sent home to Hever Castle. In February or March 1526 Henry VIII began his pursuit of Anne. She resisted his attempts to seduce her, refusing to become his mistress, as her sister Mary had previously been. Henry soon focused his desires on annulling his marriage to Catherine so he would be free to marry Anne. After Wolsey failed to obtain an annulment of Henry's marriage from Pope Clement VII, it became clear that the marriage would not be annulled by the Catholic Church. As a result, Henry and his advisers, such as Thomas Cromwell, began the breaking of the Church's power in England and closing the monasteries and the nunneries. In 1532, Henry made Anne the Marquess of Pembroke.

Henry and Anne formally married on 25 January 1533, after a secret wedding on 14 November 1532. On 23 May 1533, the newly appointed Archbishop of Canterbury Thomas Cranmer declared Henry and Catherine's marriage null and void; five days later, he declared Henry and Anne's marriage valid. Shortly afterwards, Clement excommunicated Henry and Cranmer. As a result of this marriage and these excommunications, the first break between the Church of England and the Catholic Church took place, and the king took control of the Church of England. Anne was crowned Queen of England on 1 June 1533. On 7 September, she gave birth to the future Queen Elizabeth I. Henry was disappointed to have a daughter rather than a son but hoped a son would follow and professed to love Elizabeth. Anne subsequently had three miscarriages and by March 1536, Henry was courting Jane Seymour. In order to marry Seymour, Henry had to find reasons to end the marriage to Anne.

Henry VIII had Anne investigated for high treason in April 1536. On 2 May, she was arrested and sent to the Tower of London, where she was tried before a jury of peers, including Henry Percy, her former betrothed, and her uncle Thomas Howard, 3rd Duke of Norfolk; she was convicted on 15 May and beheaded four days later. Modern historians view the charges against her, which included adultery, incest and plotting to kill the king, as unconvincing.

After her daughter, Elizabeth, became Queen in 1558, Anne became venerated as a martyr and heroine of the English Reformation, particularly through the written works of John Foxe. She has inspired, or been mentioned in, many artistic and cultural works and retained her hold on the popular imagination. She has been called "the most influential and important queen consort England has ever had", as she provided the occasion for Henry VIII to annul his marriage to Catherine of Aragon and declare the English church's independence from the Vatican.

Early years 
Anne was the daughter of Thomas Boleyn, later Earl of Wiltshire and Earl of Ormond, and his wife, Elizabeth Howard, who was the daughter of Thomas Howard, Earl of Surrey, later 2nd Duke of Norfolk. Thomas Boleyn was a well-respected diplomat with a gift for languages; he was also a favourite of Henry VII of England, who sent him on many diplomatic missions abroad. Anne and her siblings grew up at Hever Castle in Kent. They were born in Norfolk at the Boleyn home at Blickling. A lack of parish records has made it impossible to establish Anne's date of birth. Contemporary evidence is contradictory, with several dates having been put forward by various historians. An Italian, writing in 1600, suggested that she had been born in 1499, while Sir Thomas More's son-in-law William Roper gave a date of 1512. Her birth is widely accepted by scholars and historians as most likely between 1501 and 1507.

As with Anne, it is uncertain when her two siblings were born, but it seems clear that her sister Mary was older than Anne. Mary's children clearly believed their mother was the elder sister. Mary's grandson claimed the Ormonde title in 1596 on the basis that she was the elder daughter, which Elizabeth I accepted. Their brother George was born around 1504.

The academic debate about Anne's birth date focuses on two key dates: c. 1501 and c. 1507. Eric Ives, a British historian and legal expert, advocates 1501, while Retha Warnicke, an American scholar who has also written a biography of Anne, prefers 1507. The key piece of surviving written evidence is a letter Anne wrote sometime in 1514. She wrote it in French to her father, who was still living in England while Anne was completing her education at Mechelen, in the Burgundian Netherlands, now Belgium. Ives argues that the style of the letter and its mature handwriting prove that Anne must have been about 13 at the time of its composition, while Warnicke argues that the numerous misspellings and grammar errors show that the letter was written by a child. In Ives's view, this would also be around the minimum age that a girl could be a maid of honour, as Anne was to the regent, Margaret of Austria. This is supported by claims of a chronicler from the late 16th century, who wrote that Anne was 20 when she returned from France. These findings are contested by Warnicke in several books and articles, and the evidence does not conclusively support either date.

Two independent contemporary sources support the 1507 date. Author Gareth Russell wrote a summary of the evidence and relates that Jane Dormer, Duchess of Feria, wrote her memoirs shortly before her death in 1612. The former lady-in-waiting and confidante to Queen Mary I wrote of Anne Boleyn: "She was convicted and condemned and was not yet twenty-nine years of age." William Camden wrote a history of the reign of Elizabeth I and was granted access to the private papers of Lord Burghley and to the state archives. In that history, in the chapter dealing with Elizabeth's early life, he records in the margin that Anne was born in MDVII (1507).

Anne's great-great-great-grandparents included a Lord Mayor of London, a duke, an earl, two aristocratic ladies and a knight. One of them, Geoffrey Boleyn, had been a mercer and wool merchant before becoming Lord Mayor. Anne's relatives included the Howards, one of the preeminent families in England; and Anne's ancestors included King Edward I of England. According to Eric Ives, she was certainly of more noble birth than Jane Seymour and Catherine Parr, Henry VIII's other English wives. The spelling of the Boleyn name was variable, as common at the time. Sometimes it was written as Bullen, hence the bull's heads which formed part of her family arms.

At the court of Margaret of Austria in the Netherlands, Anne is listed as Boullan. From there she signed the letter to her father as Anna de Boullan. She was also called "Anna Bolina"; this Latinised form is used in most portraits of her.

Anne's early education was typical for women of her class. In 1513, she was invited to join the schoolroom of Margaret of Austria and her four wards. Her academic education was limited to arithmetic, her family genealogy, grammar, history, reading, spelling and writing. She also developed domestic skills such as dancing, embroidery, good manners, household management, music, needlework and singing. Anne learned to play games, such as cards, chess and dice. She was also taught archery, falconry, horseback riding and hunting.

The Netherlands and France 

Anne's father continued his diplomatic career under Henry VIII. In Europe, his charm won many admirers, including Margaret of Austria, daughter of Maximilian I, Holy Roman Emperor. During this period, Margaret ruled the Netherlands on her nephew Charles's behalf and was so impressed with Boleyn that she offered his daughter Anne a place in her household. Ordinarily, a girl had to be 12 years old to have such an honour, but Anne may have been younger, as Margaret affectionately called her  . Anne made a good impression in the Netherlands with her manners and studiousness; Margaret reported that she was well spoken and pleasant for her young age, and told Thomas that his daughter was "so presentable and so pleasant, considering her youthful age, that I am more beholden to you for sending her to me, than you to me" (E. W. Ives, op.cit.). Anne stayed at the Court of Savoy in Mechelen from spring 1513 until her father arranged for her to attend Henry VIII's sister Mary, who was about to marry Louis XII of France in October 1514.

In France, Anne was a maid of honour to Queen Mary, and then to Mary's 15-year-old stepdaughter Queen Claude, with whom she stayed nearly seven years. In the Queen's household, she completed her study of French and developed interests in art, fashion, illuminated manuscripts, literature, music, poetry and religious philosophy. She also acquired knowledge of French culture, dance, etiquette, literature, music and poetry; and gained experience in flirtation and courtly love. Though all knowledge of Anne's experiences in the French court is conjecture, even Ives suggests that she was likely to have made the acquaintance of King Francis I's sister, Marguerite de Navarre, a patron of humanists and reformers. Marguerite de Navarre was also an author in her own right, and her works include elements of Christian mysticism and reform that verged on heresy, though she was protected by her status as the French king's beloved sister. She or her circle may have encouraged Anne's interest in religious reform, as well as in poetry and literature. Anne's education in France proved itself in later years, inspiring many new trends among the ladies and courtiers of England. It may have been instrumental in pressing their King toward the culture-shattering contretemps with the Papacy. William Forrest, author of a contemporary poem about Catherine of Aragon, complimented Anne's "passing excellent" skill as a dancer. "Here", he wrote, "was [a] fresh young damsel, that could trip and go."

At the court of Henry VIII: 1522–1533 
Anne was recalled to marry her Irish cousin, James Butler, a young man several years older than she who was living at the English court. The marriage was intended to settle a dispute over the title and estates of the Earldom of Ormond. The 7th Earl of Ormond died in 1515, leaving his daughters, Margaret Boleyn and Anne St Leger, as co-heiresses. In Ireland, the great-great-grandson of the third earl, Sir Piers Butler, contested the will and claimed the earldom himself. He was already in possession of Kilkenny Castle, the earls' ancestral seat. Sir Thomas Boleyn, being the son of the eldest daughter, believed the title properly belonged to him and protested to his brother-in-law, the Duke of Norfolk, who spoke to Henry about the matter. Henry, fearful the dispute could ignite civil war in Ireland, sought to resolve the matter by arranging an alliance between Piers's son, James and Anne Boleyn. She would bring her Ormond inheritance as dowry and thus end the dispute. The plan ended in failure, perhaps because Sir Thomas hoped for a grander marriage for his daughter or because he himself coveted the titles. Whatever the reason, the marriage negotiations came to a complete halt. James Butler later married Lady Joan Fitzgerald, daughter and heiress of James FitzGerald, 10th Earl of Desmond and Amy O'Brien.

Mary Boleyn, Anne Boleyn's older sister, had been recalled from France in late 1519, ostensibly to end her affairs with the French king and his courtiers. She married William Carey, a minor noble, in February 1520, at Greenwich, with Henry VIII in attendance. Soon after, Mary became the English King's mistress. Historians dispute Henry VIII's paternity of one or both of Mary Boleyn's children born during this marriage. Henry VIII: The King and His Court, by Alison Weir, questions the paternity of Henry Carey; Dr. G.W. Bernard (The King's Reformation) and Joanna Denny (Anne Boleyn: A New Life of England's Tragic Queen) argue that Henry VIII was their father. Henry did not acknowledge either child, but he did recognize his son Henry Fitzroy, his illegitimate son by Elizabeth Blount, Lady Talboys.

Anne made her début at the Château Vert (Green Castle) pageant in honour of the imperial ambassadors on 4 March 1522, playing "Perseverance" (one of the characters in the play). There she took part in an elaborate dance accompanying Henry's younger sister Mary, several other ladies of the court and her sister. All wore gowns of white satin embroidered with gold thread. She quickly established herself as one of the most stylish and accomplished women at the court, and soon a number of young men were competing for her.

Warnicke writes that Anne was "the perfect woman courtier... her carriage was graceful and her French clothes were pleasing and stylish; she danced with ease, had a pleasant singing voice, played the lute and several other musical instruments well, and spoke French fluently... A remarkable, intelligent, quick-witted young noblewoman... that first drew people into conversation with her and then amused and entertained them. In short, her energy and vitality made her the center of attention in any social gathering." Henry VIII's biographer J. J. Scarisbrick adds that Anne "revelled in" the attention she received from her admirers.

During this time, Anne was courted by Henry Percy, son of the Earl of Northumberland, and entered into a secret betrothal with him. Thomas Wolsey's gentleman usher, George Cavendish, maintained the two had not been lovers. The romance was broken off when Percy's father refused to support their engagement. Wolsey refused the match for several conjectured reasons. According to Cavendish, Anne was sent from court to her family's countryside estates, but it is not known for how long. Upon her return to court, she again entered the service of Catherine of Aragon. Percy was married to Lady Mary Talbot, to whom he had been betrothed since adolescence.

Before marrying Henry VIII, Anne had befriended Sir Thomas Wyatt, one of the greatest poets of the Tudor period. In 1520, Wyatt married Elizabeth Cobham, who by many accounts was not a wife of his choosing. In 1525, Wyatt charged his wife with adultery and separated from her; coincidentally, historians believe that it was also the year when his interest in Anne intensified. In 1532, Wyatt accompanied the royal couple to Calais.

In 1526, Henry VIII became enamoured of Anne and began his pursuit. Anne was a skilful player at the game of courtly love, which was often played in the antechambers. This may have been how she caught the eye of Henry, who was also an experienced player. Some say that Anne resisted Henry's attempts to seduce her, refusing to become his mistress, and often leaving court for the seclusion of Hever Castle. But within a year, he proposed marriage to her, and she accepted. Both assumed an annulment could be obtained within months. There is no evidence to suggest that they engaged in a sexual relationship until very shortly before their marriage; Henry's love letters to Anne suggest that their love affair remained unconsummated for much of their seven-year courtship.

Henry's annulment 
It is probable that Henry had thought of the idea of annulment (not divorce as commonly assumed) much earlier than this as he strongly desired a male heir to secure the Tudor claim to the crown. Before Henry VII ascended the throne, England was beset by civil warfare over rival claims to the crown, and Henry VIII wanted to avoid similar uncertainty over the succession. He and Catherine had no living sons: all Catherine's children except Mary died in infancy. Catherine had first come to England to be bride to Henry's brother Arthur, who died soon after their marriage. Since Spain and England still wanted an alliance, Pope Julius II granted a dispensation for their marriage on the grounds that Catherine was still a virgin.

Catherine and Henry married in 1509 but eventually, he became dubious about the marriage's validity, claiming that Catherine's inability to provide an heir was a sign of God's displeasure. His feelings for Anne, and her refusals to become his mistress, probably contributed to Henry's decision that no Pope had a right to overrule the Bible. This meant that he had been living in sin with Catherine all these years, though Catherine hotly contested this and refused to concede that her marriage to Arthur had been consummated.  It also meant that his daughter Mary was a bastard, and that the new pope (Clement VII) would have to admit the previous pope's mistake and annul the marriage. Henry's quest for an annulment became euphemistically known as the "King's Great Matter".

Anne saw an opportunity in Henry's infatuation and the convenient moral quandary. She determined that she would yield to his embraces only as his acknowledged queen. She began to take her place at his side in policy and in state, but not yet in his bed.

Scholars and historians hold various opinions as to how deep Anne's commitment to the Reformation was, how much she was perhaps only personally ambitious, and how much she had to do with Henry's defiance of papal power. There is anecdotal evidence, related to biographer George Wyatt by her former lady-in-waiting Anne Gainsford, that Anne brought to Henry's attention a heretical pamphlet, perhaps Tyndale's The Obedience of a Christian Man or one by Simon Fish called A Supplication for the Beggars, which cried out to monarchs to rein in the evil excesses of the Catholic Church. She was sympathetic to those seeking further reformation of the Church, and actively protected scholars working on English translations of the scriptures. According to Maria Dowling, "Anne tried to educate her waiting-women in scriptural piety" and is believed to have reproved her cousin, Mary Shelton, for "having 'idle poesies' written in her prayer book." If Cavendish is to be believed, Anne's outrage at Wolsey may have personalised whatever philosophical defiance she brought with her from France. Further, the most recent edition of Ives's biography admits that Anne may very well have had a personal spiritual awakening in her youth that spurred her on, not just as a catalyst but expediter for Henry's Reformation, though the process took years.

In 1528, sweating sickness broke out with great severity. In London, the mortality rate was great and the court was dispersed. Henry left London, frequently changing his residence; Anne Boleyn retreated to the Boleyn residence at Hever Castle, but contracted the illness; her brother-in-law, William Carey, died. Henry sent his own physician to Hever Castle to care for Anne, and shortly afterwards, she recovered.

Henry was soon absorbed in securing an annulment from Catherine. He set his hopes upon a direct appeal to the Holy See, acting independently of Wolsey, to whom he at first communicated nothing of his plans related to Anne. In 1527 William Knight, the king's secretary, was sent to Pope Clement VII to sue for the annulment of Henry's marriage to Catherine, on the grounds that the dispensing bull of Julius II permitting him to marry his brother's widow, Catherine, had been obtained under false pretences. Henry also petitioned, in the event of his becoming free, a dispensation to contract a new marriage with any woman even in the first degree of affinity, whether the affinity was contracted by lawful or unlawful connection. This clearly referred to Anne.

As Clement was at that time a prisoner of Charles V, the Holy Roman Emperor, as a result of the Sack of Rome in May 1527, Knight had some difficulty obtaining access. In the end he had to return with a conditional dispensation, which Wolsey insisted was technically insufficient. Henry then had no choice but to put his great matter into Wolsey's hands, who did all he could to secure a decision in Henry's favour, even going so far as to convene an ecclesiastical court in England, with a special emissary, Lorenzo Campeggio, from Clement to decide the matter. But Clement had not empowered his deputy to make a decision. He was still Charles V's hostage, and Charles V was loyal to his aunt Catherine. The pope forbade Henry to contract a new marriage until a decision was reached in Rome, not in England. Convinced that Wolsey's loyalties lay with the pope, not England, Anne, as well as Wolsey's many enemies, ensured his dismissal from public office in 1529. Cavendish, Wolsey's chamberlain, records that the servants who waited on the king and Anne at dinner in 1529 in Grafton heard her say that the dishonour Wolsey had brought upon the realm would have cost any other Englishman his head. Henry replied, "Why then I perceive...you are not the Cardinal's friend." Henry finally agreed to Wolsey's arrest on grounds of praemunire. Had it not been for his death from illness in 1530, Wolsey might have been executed for treason. In 1531 (two years before Henry's marriage to Anne), Catherine was banished from court and her rooms given to Anne.

Public support remained with Catherine. One evening, in the autumn of 1531, Anne was dining at a manor house on the River Thames and was almost seized by a crowd of angry women. Anne just managed to escape by boat.

When Archbishop of Canterbury William Warham died in 1532, the Boleyn family chaplain, Thomas Cranmer, was appointed, with papal approval.

In 1532, Thomas Cromwell brought before Parliament a number of acts, including the Supplication against the Ordinaries and Submission of the Clergy, which recognised royal supremacy over the church, thus finalising the break with Rome. Following these acts, Thomas More resigned as Chancellor, leaving Cromwell as Henry's chief minister.

Premarital role and marriage 
Even before her marriage, Anne Boleyn was able to grant petitions, receive diplomats and give patronage, and had an influence over Henry to plead the cause of foreign diplomats.

During this period, Anne played an important role in England's international position by solidifying an alliance with France. She established an excellent rapport with the French ambassador, Gilles de la Pommeraie. Anne and Henry attended a meeting with the French king at Calais in winter 1532, at which Henry hoped to enlist the support of Francis I of France for his intended marriage. On 1 September 1532, Henry granted her the Marquessate of Pembroke, an appropriate peerage for a future queen; as such she became a rich and important woman: the three dukes and two marquesses who existed in 1532 were Henry's brother-in-law, Henry's illegitimate son and other descendants of royalty; she ranked above all other peeresses. The Pembroke lands and the title of Earl of Pembroke had been held by Henry's great-uncle, and Henry performed the investiture himself.

Anne's family also profited from the relationship. Her father, already Viscount Rochford, was created Earl of Wiltshire. Henry also came to an arrangement with Anne's Irish cousin and created him Earl of Ormond. At the magnificent banquet to celebrate her father's elevation, Anne took precedence over the Duchesses of Suffolk and Norfolk, seated in the place of honour beside the king that was usually occupied by the queen. Thanks to Anne's intervention, her widowed sister Mary received an annual pension of £100, and Mary's son, Henry Carey, was educated at a prestigious Cistercian monastery.

The conference at Calais was something of a political triumph, but even though the French government gave implicit support for Henry's remarriage and Francis I had a private conference with Anne, the French king maintained alliances with the Pope that he could not explicitly defy.

Soon after returning to Dover, Henry and Anne married in a secret ceremony on 14 November 1532. She soon became pregnant and, to legalise the first wedding considered to be unlawful at the time, there was a second wedding service, also private in accordance with The Royal Book, in London on 25 January 1533. Events now began to move at a quick pace. On 23 May 1533, Cranmer (who had been hastened, with the Pope's assent, into the position of Archbishop of Canterbury recently vacated by the death of Warham) sat in judgement at a special court convened at Dunstable Priory to rule on the validity of Henry's marriage to Catherine. He declared it null and void. Five days later, on 28 May 1533, Cranmer declared the marriage of Henry and Anne good and valid.

Queen of England: 1533–1536 

Catherine was formally stripped of her title as queen and Anne was consequently crowned queen consort on 1 June 1533 in a magnificent ceremony at Westminster Abbey with a banquet afterwards. She was the last queen consort of England to be crowned separately from her husband. Unlike any other queen consort, Anne was crowned with St Edward's Crown, which had previously been used to crown only monarchs. Historian Alice Hunt suggests that this was done because Anne's pregnancy was visible by then and the child was presumed to be male. On the previous day, Anne had taken part in an elaborate procession through the streets of London seated in a litter of "white cloth of gold" that rested on two palfreys clothed to the ground in white damask, while the barons of the Cinque Ports held a canopy of cloth of gold over her head. In accordance with tradition, she wore white, and on her head, a gold coronet beneath which her long dark hair hung down freely. The public's response to her appearance was lukewarm.

Meanwhile, the House of Commons had forbidden all appeals to Rome and exacted the penalties of praemunire against all who introduced papal bulls into England. It was only then that Pope Clement, at last, took the step of announcing a provisional excommunication of Henry and Cranmer. He condemned the marriage to Anne, and in March 1534 declared the marriage to Catherine legal and again ordered Henry to return to her. Henry now required his subjects to swear an oath attached to the First Succession Act, which effectively rejected papal authority in legal matters and recognised Anne Boleyn as queen. Those who refused, such as Sir Thomas More, who had resigned as Lord Chancellor, and John Fisher, Bishop of Rochester, were placed in the Tower of London. In late 1534 parliament declared Henry "the only supreme head on earth of the Church of England". The Church in England was now under Henry's control, not Rome's. On 14 May 1534, in one of the realm's first official acts protecting Protestant Reformers, Anne wrote a letter to Thomas Cromwell seeking his aid in ensuring that English merchant Richard Herman be reinstated a member of the merchant adventurers in Antwerp and no longer persecuted simply because he had helped in "setting forth of the New testament in English." Before and after her coronation, Anne protected and promoted evangelicals and those wishing to study the scriptures of William Tyndale. She had a decisive role in influencing the Protestant reformer Matthew Parker to attend court as her chaplain, and before her death entrusted her daughter to Parker's care.

Struggle for a son 
After her coronation, Anne settled into a quiet routine at the king's favourite residence, Greenwich Palace, to prepare for the birth of her baby. The child was born slightly prematurely on 7 September 1533 between three and four in the afternoon. Anne gave birth to a girl, who was christened Elizabeth, probably in honour of either or both Anne's mother Elizabeth Howard and Henry's mother, Elizabeth of York. But the birth of a girl was a heavy blow to her parents, who had confidently expected a boy. All but one of the royal physicians and astrologers had predicted a son and the French king had been asked to stand as his godfather. Now the prepared letters announcing the birth of a prince had an s hastily added to them to read princes[s] and the traditional jousting tournament for the birth of an heir was cancelled.

The infant princess was given a splendid christening, but Anne feared that Catherine's daughter, Mary, now stripped of her title of princess and labelled a bastard, posed a threat to Elizabeth's position. Henry soothed his wife's fears by separating Mary from her many servants and sending her to Hatfield House, where Elizabeth would live with her own sizeable staff of servants and the country air was thought better for the baby's health. Anne frequently visited her daughter at Hatfield and other residences.

The new queen had a larger staff of servants than Catherine. There were more than 250 servants to tend to her personal needs, from priests to stable boys, and more than 60 maids-of-honour who served her and accompanied her to social events. She also employed several priests who acted as her confessors, chaplains and religious advisers. One of these was Matthew Parker, who became one of the chief architects of Anglican thought during the reign of Anne's daughter, Elizabeth I.

Strife with the king 

The king and his new queen enjoyed a reasonably happy accord with periods of calm and affection. Anne's sharp intelligence, political acumen and forward manners, although desirable in a mistress, were, at the time, unacceptable in a wife. She was once reported to have spoken to her uncle in words that "shouldn't be used to a dog". After a stillbirth or miscarriage as early as Christmas 1534, Henry was discussing with Cranmer and Cromwell the possibility of divorcing her without having to return to Catherine. Nothing came of the matter as the royal couple reconciled and spent summer 1535 on progress. By October, she was again pregnant.

Anne presided over a court. She spent lavish amounts of money on gowns, jewels, head-dresses, ostrich-feather fans, riding equipment, furniture and upholstery, maintaining the ostentatious display required by her status. Numerous palaces were renovated to suit her and Henry's extravagant tastes. Her motto was "The most happy", and she chose a white falcon as her personal device.

Anne was blamed for Henry's tyranny and called by some of her subjects "the king's whore" or a "naughty paike [prostitute]". Public opinion turned further against her after her failure to produce a son. It sank even lower after the executions of her enemies More and Fisher.

Downfall and execution: 1536 

On 8 January 1536, news of Catherine of Aragon's death reached Anne and the king, who was overjoyed. The following day, Henry wore yellow, a symbol of joy and celebration in England but of mourning in Spain, from head to toe, and celebrated Catherine's death with festivities. With Catherine dead, Anne attempted to make peace with Mary. Mary rebuffed Anne's overtures, perhaps because of rumours circulating that Catherine had been poisoned by Anne or Henry. These began after the discovery during her embalming that Catherine's heart was blackened. Modern medical experts are in agreement that this was not the result of poisoning, but of cancer of the heart, an extremely rare condition which was not understood at the time.

Queen Anne, pregnant again, was aware of the dangers if she failed to give birth to a son. With Catherine dead, Henry would be free to marry without any taint of illegality. At this time, Henry began paying court to one of Anne's maids-of-honour, Jane Seymour, and allegedly gave her a locket containing a portrait miniature of himself. While wearing this locket in the presence of Anne, Jane began opening and closing it. Anne responded by ripping the locket off Jane's neck with such force that her fingers bled.

Later that month, the king was unhorsed in a tournament and knocked unconscious for two hours, a worrying incident that Anne believed led to her miscarriage five days later. Another possible cause of the miscarriage was an incident in which, upon entering a room, Anne saw Jane Seymour sitting on Henry's lap and flew into a rage. Whatever the cause, on the day that Catherine of Aragon was buried at Peterborough Abbey, Anne miscarried a baby which, according to the imperial ambassador Eustace Chapuys, she had borne for about three and a half months, and which "seemed to be a male child". Chapuys commented "She has miscarried of her saviour." In Chapuys' opinion, this loss was the beginning of the end of the royal marriage.

Given Henry's desperate desire for a son, the sequence of Anne's pregnancies has attracted much interest. Mike Ashley speculated that Anne had two stillborn children after Elizabeth's birth and before the male child she miscarried in 1536. Most sources attest only to the birth of Elizabeth in September 1533, a possible miscarriage in the summer of 1534, and the miscarriage of a male child, of almost four months' gestation, in January 1536. As Anne recovered from her miscarriage, Henry declared that he had been seduced into the marriage by means of "sortilege" – a French term indicating either "deception" or "spells". His new mistress, Jane Seymour, was quickly moved into royal quarters. This was followed by Anne's brother George being refused a prestigious court honour, the Order of the Garter, given instead to Sir Nicholas Carew.

Charges of adultery, incest and treason 

Anne's biographer Eric Ives believes that her fall and execution were primarily engineered by her former ally Thomas Cromwell. The conversations between Chapuys and Cromwell thereafter indicate Cromwell as the instigator of the plot to remove Anne; evidence of this is seen in the Spanish Chronicle and through letters written from Chapuys to Charles V. Anne argued with Cromwell over the redistribution of Church revenues and over foreign policy. She advocated that revenues be distributed to charitable and educational institutions; and she favoured a French alliance. Cromwell insisted on filling the king's depleted coffers, while taking a cut for himself, and preferred an imperial alliance. For these reasons, Ives suggests, "Anne Boleyn had become a major threat to Thomas Cromwell." Cromwell's biographer John Schofield, on the other hand, contends that no power struggle existed between Anne and Cromwell and that "not a trace can be found of a Cromwellian conspiracy against Anne ... Cromwell became involved in the royal marital drama only when Henry ordered him onto the case." Cromwell did not manufacture the accusations of adultery, though he and other officials used them to bolster Henry's case against Anne. Warnicke questions whether Cromwell could have or wished to manipulate the king in such a matter. Such a bold attempt by Cromwell, given the limited evidence, could have risked his office, even his life. Henry himself issued the crucial instructions: his officials, including Cromwell, carried them out. The result was by modern standards a legal travesty; however, the rules of the time were not bent in order to assure a conviction; there was no need to tamper with rules that guaranteed the desired result since law at the time was an engine of state, not a mechanism for justice.

Towards the end of April, a Flemish musician in Anne's service named Mark Smeaton was arrested. He initially denied being the queen's lover but later confessed, perhaps after being tortured or promised freedom. Another courtier, Sir Henry Norris, was arrested on May Day, but being an aristocrat, could not be tortured. Prior to his arrest, Norris was treated kindly by the king, who offered him his own horse to use on the May Day festivities. It seems likely that during the festivities, the king was notified of Smeaton's confession and it was shortly thereafter the alleged conspirators were arrested upon his orders. Norris denied his guilt and swore that Queen Anne was innocent; one of the most damaging pieces of evidence against Norris was an overheard conversation with Anne at the end of April, where she accused him of coming often to her chambers not to pay court to her lady-in-waiting Madge Shelton but to herself. Sir Francis Weston was arrested two days later on the same charge, as was Sir William Brereton, a groom of the king's Privy Chamber. Sir Thomas Wyatt, a poet and friend of the Boleyns who was allegedly infatuated with her before her marriage to the king, was also imprisoned for the same charge but later released, most likely due to his or his family's friendship with Cromwell. Sir Richard Page was also accused of having a sexual relationship with the queen, but he was acquitted of all charges after further investigation could not implicate him with Anne. The final accused was Queen Anne's own brother, George Boleyn, arrested on charges of incest and treason. He was accused of two incidents of incest: November 1535 at Whitehall and the following month at Eltham.

On 2 May 1536, Anne was arrested and taken to the Tower of London by barge. It is likely that Anne may have entered through the Court Gate in the Byward Tower rather than the Traitors' Gate, according to historian and author of The Life and Death of Anne Boleyn, Eric Ives. In the Tower, she collapsed, demanding to know the location of her father and "swete broder", as well as the charges against her.

In what is reputed to be her last letter to Henry, dated 6 May, she wrote:

Four of the accused men were tried in Westminster on 12 May 1536. Weston, Brereton and Norris publicly maintained their innocence and only Smeaton supported the Crown by pleading guilty. Three days later, Anne and George Boleyn were tried separately in the Tower of London, before a jury of 27 peers. She was accused of adultery, incest, and high treason. By the Treason Act of Edward III, adultery on the part of a queen was a form of treason (because of the implications for the succession to the throne) for which the penalty was hanging, drawing and quartering for a man and burning alive for a woman, but the accusations, and especially that of incestuous adultery, were also designed to impugn her moral character. The other form of treason alleged against her was that of plotting the king's death, with her "lovers", so that she might later marry Henry Norris. Anne's one-time betrothed, Henry Percy, 6th Earl of Northumberland, sat on the jury that unanimously found Anne guilty. When the verdict was announced, he collapsed and had to be carried from the courtroom. He died childless eight months later and was succeeded by his nephew.

On 17 May, Cranmer declared Anne's marriage to Henry null and void.

Final hours 

The accused were found guilty and condemned to death. George Boleyn and the other accused men were executed on 17 May 1536. William Kingston, the Constable of the Tower, reported Anne seemed very happy and ready to be done with life. Henry commuted Anne's sentence from burning to beheading, and rather than have a queen beheaded with the common axe, he brought an expert swordsman from Saint-Omer in France, to perform the execution. On the morning of 19 May, Kingston wrote:

Her impending death may have caused her great sorrow for some time during her imprisonment. The poem "O Death Rock Me Asleep" is generally believed to have been authored by Anne and reveals that she may have hoped death would end her suffering.

Shortly before dawn, she called Kingston to hear mass with her, and swore in his presence, on the eternal salvation of her soul, upon the Holy Sacraments, that she had never been unfaithful to the king. She ritually repeated this oath both immediately before and after receiving the sacrament of the Eucharist.

On the morning of Friday, 19 May Anne was taken to a scaffold erected on the north side of the White Tower, in front of what is now the Waterloo Barracks. She wore a red petticoat under a loose, dark grey gown of damask trimmed in fur and a mantle of ermine. Accompanied by two female attendants, Anne made her final walk from the Queen's House to the scaffold and she showed a "devilish spirit" and looked "as gay as if she was not going to die". Anne climbed the scaffold and made a short speech to the crowd:

This version of her speech is found in Foxe's Actes and Monuments and an almost identical version in Ives (2005).

Lancelot de Carle, a secretary to the French Ambassador, Antoine de Castelnau, was in London in May 1536, and was an eyewitness to her trial and execution. Two weeks after Anne's death, de Carle composed the 1,318-line poem Épistre Contenant le Procès Criminel Faict à l'Encontre de la Royne Anne Boullant d'Angleterre (A Letter Containing the Criminal Charges Laid Against Queen Anne Boleyn of England), which provides a moving account of her last words and their effect on the crowd:

It is thought that Anne avoided criticising Henry to save Elizabeth and her family from further consequences, but even under such extreme pressure Anne did not confess guilt, and indeed subtly implied her innocence, in her appeal to those who might "meddle of my cause".

Death and burial 

The ermine mantle was removed and Anne lifted off her headdress, tucking her hair under a coif. After a brief farewell to her weeping ladies and a request for prayers, she knelt down and one of her ladies tied a blindfold over her eyes. She knelt upright, in the French style of beheadings. Her final prayer consisted of her repeating continually, "Jesu receive my soul; O Lord God have pity on my soul."

The execution consisted of a single stroke. It was witnessed by Thomas Cromwell; Charles Brandon, 1st Duke of Suffolk; the king's illegitimate son, Henry FitzRoy; the Lord Mayor of London, as well as aldermen, sheriffs and representatives of the various craft guilds. Most of the king's council were also present. Cranmer, who was at Lambeth Palace, was reported to have broken down in tears after telling Alexander Ales: "She who has been the Queen of England on earth will today become a Queen in heaven." When the charges were first brought against Anne, Cranmer had expressed his astonishment to Henry and his belief that "she should not be culpable".
 

Cranmer felt vulnerable because of his closeness to the queen; on the night before the execution, he declared Henry's marriage to Anne to have been void, like Catherine's before her. He made no serious attempt to save Anne's life, although some sources record that he had prepared her for death by hearing her last private confession of sins, in which she had stated her innocence before God. On the day of her death, a Scottish friend found Cranmer weeping uncontrollably in his London gardens, saying that he was sure that Anne had now gone to Heaven.

She was then buried in an unmarked grave in the Chapel of St Peter ad Vincula. Her skeleton was identified during renovations of the chapel in 1876, in the reign of Queen Victoria, and Anne's grave is now identified on the marble floor.

Recognition and legacy 

Nicholas Sanders, a Catholic recusant born , was committed to deposing Elizabeth I and re-establishing Catholicism in England. In his De Origine ac Progressu schismatis Anglicani (The Rise and Growth of the Anglican Schism), published in 1585, he was the first to write that Anne had six fingers on her right hand. Since physical deformities were generally interpreted as a sign of evil, it is unlikely that Anne Boleyn would have gained Henry's romantic attention had she had any. Upon exhumation in 1876, no abnormalities were discovered.

Anne Boleyn was described by contemporaries as intelligent and gifted in musical arts and scholarly pursuits. She was also strong-willed and proud, and often quarrelled with Henry. Biographer Eric Ives evaluates the apparent contradictions in Anne's persona:

No contemporary portraits of Anne Boleyn survive. A bust of her was cast on a commemorative medallion in 1534, believed to have been struck to celebrate her second pregnancy.

Following the coronation of her daughter as queen, Anne was venerated as a martyr and heroine of the English Reformation, particularly through the works of John Foxe, who argued that Anne had saved England from the evils of Roman Catholicism and that God had provided proof of her innocence and virtue by making sure her daughter Elizabeth I ascended the throne. An example of Anne's direct influence in the reformed church is what Alexander Ales described to Queen Elizabeth as the "evangelical bishops whom your holy mother appointed from among those scholars who favoured the purer doctrine". Over the centuries, Anne has inspired or been mentioned in numerous artistic and cultural works. As a result, she has remained in the popular memory and has been called "the most influential and important queen consort England has ever had."

Appearance and Portraits

Anne's appearance has been much discussed by historians, as all of her portraits were destroyed following an order by Henry VIII, who wanted to erase her from history. Many surviving depictions of her may be copies of a lost original that apparently existed as late as 1773. One of the only contemporary likenesses of Anne was captured on a medal referred to as "The Moost Happi Medal" which was struck in 1536, probably to celebrate her pregnancy which occurred around that time. The other possible portrait of Anne was a secret locket ring that her daughter Elizabeth I possessed and was taken from one of her fingers at her death in 1603.
 
 

 
Another possible portrait of Anne was discovered in 2015 painted by artist Nidd Hall. Some scholars believe that it portrays Anne because it resembles the 1536 medal more than any other depiction. However, others believe that it is actually a portrait of her successor Jane Seymour.

Holbein sketches

 
Hans Holbein originally painted Anne's portrait and also sketched her during her lifetime. There are two surviving sketches that have been identified to be of Anne, by historians and people who knew her. Most scholars believe that Anne cannot be one of the two, as the portrayals do not look similar to each other, whilst others think that they do show the same woman but in one sketch she is pregnant, whilst in the other she is not. 

She was considered brilliant, charming, driven, elegant, forthright and graceful, with a keen wit and a lively, opinionated and passionate personality. Anne was depicted as "sweet and cheerful" in her youth and enjoyed cards and dice games, drinking wine, French cuisine, flirting, gambling, gossiping and good jokes. She was fond of archery, falconry, hunting and the occasional game of bowls. She also had a sharp tongue and a terrible temper.
 
Anne exerted a powerful charm on those who met her, though opinions differed on her attractiveness. The Venetian diarist Marino Sanuto, who saw Anne when Henry VIII met Francis I at Calais in October 1532, described her as "not one of the handsomest women in the world; she is of middling stature, swarthy complexion, long neck, wide mouth, bosom not much raised ... eyes, which are black and beautiful". Simon Grynée wrote to Martin Bucer in September 1531 that Anne was "young, good-looking, of a rather dark complexion". Lancelot de Carle called her "beautiful with an elegant figure", and a Venetian in Paris in 1528 also reported that she was said to be beautiful.
 
The most influential description of Anne, but also the least reliable, was written by the Catholic propagandist and polemicist Nicholas Sanders in 1586, half a century after Anne's death: 

 
As Sanders held Anne responsible for Henry VIII's rejection of the Catholic Church he was keen to demonise her. Sanders's description contributed to what Ives calls the "monster legend" of Anne Boleyn. Though his details were fictitious, they have formed the basis for references to Anne's appearance even in some modern textbooks.

Faith and spirituality 

Because of Anne's early exposure to court life, she had powerful influences around her for most of her life. These early influences were mostly women who were engaged with art, history and religion. Eric Ives described the women around Anne as "aristocratic women seeking spiritual fulfillment". They included Queen Claude, of whose court Anne was a member, and Marguerite of Angoulême, who was a well-known figure during the Renaissance and held strong religious views that she portrayed through poetry. These women along with Anne's immediate family members, such as her father, may have had a large influence on Anne's personal faith.

Anne's experience in France made her a devout Christian in the new tradition of Renaissance humanism. Anne knew little Latin and, trained at a French court, she was influenced by an "evangelical variety of French humanism", which led her to champion the vernacular Bible. She later held the reformist position that the papacy was a corrupting influence on Christianity, but her conservative tendencies could be seen in her devotion to the Virgin Mary. Anne's European education ended in 1521, when her father summoned her back to England. She sailed from Calais in January 1522.

Another clue to Anne's personal faith could be found in Anne's book of hours, in which she wrote, "le temps viendra" ["the time will come"]. Alongside this inscription, she drew an astrolabe, which at the time was a symbol of the Renaissance. The inscription implies that Anne was a Renaissance woman, exposed to new ideas and thoughts relating to her faith.

Anne Boleyn's last words before her beheading were a prayer for her salvation, her king, and her country. She said, "Good Christian people! I am come hither to die, for according to the law, and by the law, I am judged to death; and therefore I will speak nothing against it. I come hither to accuse no man, nor to any thing of that whereof I am accused and condemned to die; but I pray God save the king, and send him long to reign over you, for a gentler, or a more merciful prince was there never; and to me he was ever a good, a gentle, and a sovereign lord." John Foxe, martyrologist, included Anne in his book, Foxe's Book of Martyrs, claiming she was a good woman who had sincere faith and trust in her God. Foxe also believed a sign of Anne's good faith was God's blessing on her daughter, Elizabeth I, and God allowing Elizabeth to prosper as queen.

Legends 
Many legends and stories about Anne Boleyn have existed over the centuries. One is that she was secretly buried in Salle Church in Norfolk under a black slab near the tombs of her ancestors. Her body was said to have rested in an Essex church on its journey to Norfolk. Another is that her heart, at her request, was buried in Erwarton (Arwarton) Church, Suffolk by her uncle Sir Philip Parker.

In 18th-century Sicily, the peasants of the village of Nicolosi believed that Anne Boleyn, for having made Henry VIII a heretic, was condemned to burn for eternity inside Mount Etna. This legend was often told for the benefit of foreign travellers.

A number of people have claimed to have seen Anne's ghost at Hever Castle, Blickling Hall, Salle Church, the Tower of London and Marwell Hall. One account of her reputed sighting was given by paranormal researcher Hans Holzer. In 1864, Captain (later Major General) J. D. Dundas of the 60th Rifles regiment was billeted in the Tower of London. As he was looking out the window of his quarters, he noticed a guard below in the courtyard, in front of the lodgings where Anne had been imprisoned, behaving strangely. He appeared to challenge something, which to Dundas "looked like a whitish, female figure sliding towards the soldier". The guard charged through the form with his bayonet, then fainted. Only the captain's testimony and corroboration at the court-martial saved the guard from a lengthy prison sentence for having fainted while on duty. In 1960, Canon W. S. Pakenham-Walsh, vicar of Sulgrave, Northamptonshire, reported having conversations with Anne.

Issue

See also 

 Bring Up the Bodies, a book by Hilary Mantel (2012)
 Anna Bolena, an opera by Gaetano Donizetti with lyrics by Felice Romani (1830)
 Anne of the Thousand Days, a 1969 film distributed by Universal Pictures based on the stage play by Maxwell Anderson
 "With Her Head Tucked Underneath Her Arm", a darkly humorous song about Anne's ghost
 The Other Boleyn Girl, a book by Philippa Gregory later adapted into a 2008 film which has Mary's sister Anne as one of the main characters. An earlier television adaptation of the book was made by the BBC in 2003.
 The Boleyn Heresy: The Time Will Come by Kathleen McGowan, a novel about a 21st century researcher into the life of Anne Boleyn seeking to exonerate her reputation.

References

Bibliography 

 Ashley, Mike British Kings & Queens (2002) 
 Baumann, Uwe, ed. Henry VIII in history, historiography, and literature (Peter Lang, 1992).
 Bell, Doyne C. Notices of the Historic Persons Buried in the Chapel of St. Peter ad Vincula in the Tower of London (1877)
 
 Bernard, G. W. "The fall of Anne Boleyn", English Historical Review, 106 (1991), 584–610 in JSTOR
 Brigden, Susan New Worlds, Lost Worlds (2000)
 
 Elton, G. R. Reform and Reformation. London: Edward Arnold, 1977. .
 Davenby, C "Objects of Patriarchy" (2012) (Feminist Study)
 Dowling, Maria "A Woman's Place? Learning and the Wives of King Henry VII." History Today, 38–42 (1991).
 Dowling, Maria Humanism in the Age of Henry the VIII (1986)
 
 Fraser, Antonia The Wives of Henry VIII New York: Knopf (1992) 
 Graves, Michael Henry VIII. London, Pearson Longman, 2003 
  
 Haigh, Christopher English Reformations (1993)
 Hibbert, Christopher Tower of London: A History of England From the Norman Conquest (1971)
 Ives, Eric The Life and Death of Anne Boleyn (2004) 
 
 Ives, E. W. "Anne (c.1500–1536)", Oxford Dictionary of National Biography, (2004) accessed 8 September 2011
 Lacey, Robert The Life and Times of Henry VIII (1972)
 Lehmberg, Stanford E. The Reformation Parliament, 1529–1536 (1970)
 
 Lindsey, Karen Divorced Beheaded Survived: A Feminist Reinterpretation of the Wives of Henry VIII (1995) 
 MacCulloch, Diarmaid Thomas Cranmer New Haven: Yale University Press (1996) .
 Morris, T. A. Europe and England in the Sixteenth Century (1998)
 Norton, Elizabeth Anne Boleyn: Henry VIII's Obsession 2009 hardback  paperback 
 Parker, K. T. The Drawings of Hans Holbein at Windsor Castle Oxford: Phaidon (1945)OCLC 822974.
 Rowlands, John The Age of Dürer and Holbein London: British Museum (1988) 
 Scarisbrick, J. J. Henry VIII (1972) 
 Schama, Simon A History of Britain: At the Edge of the World?: 3000 BC–AD 1603 (2000) 
 
 
 Schofield, John. The Rise & Fall of Thomas Cromwell. Stroud (UK): The History Press, 2008. .
 Somerset, Anne Elizabeth I. London: Phoenix (1997) 
 Starkey, David Six Wives: The Queens of Henry VIII (2003) 
 Strong, Roy Tudor & Jacobean Portraits. London: HMSO (1969)OCLC 71370718.
 Walker, Greg. "Rethinking the Fall of Anne Boleyn," Historical Journal, March 2002, Vol. 45 Issue 1, pp 1–29; blames what she said in incautious conversations with the men who were executed with her
 Warnicke, Retha M. "The Fall of Anne Boleyn: A Reassessment," History, Feb 1985, Vol. 70 Issue 228, pp 1–15; stresses role of Sir Thomas Cromwell, the ultimate winner
  in JSTOR
 Warnicke, Retha M. The Rise and Fall of Anne Boleyn: Family politics at the court of Henry VIII (1989) 
 Warnicke, Retha M. "Sexual heresy at the court of Henry VIII." Historical Journal 30.2 (1987): 247–268.
 
 Weir, Allison "The Lady in the Tower: The Fall of Anne Boleyn" 
 Williams, Neville Henry VIII and His Court (1971).
 Wilson, Derek Hans Holbein: Portrait of an Unknown Man London: Pimlico, Revised Edition (2006) 
 Wooding, Lucy Henry VIII London: Routledge, 2009

Further reading 

 
 To Die For: A Novel of Anne Boleyn, (2011) by Sandra Byrd, 
 The Politics of Marriage by David Loades (1994)
 The Hever Castle Guide Book

External links 

 
 Leanda de Lisle: Why Anne Boleyn was Beheaded with a Sword and not an Axe
 Henry VIII to Anne Boleyn: the love letters at the Internet Archive
 Anne Boleyn at Salle church Norfolk, UK
 
 

|-

 
1500s births
1536 deaths
16th-century English women
Annulment
Anne
Burials at the Church of St Peter ad Vincula
Converts to Anglicanism from Roman Catholicism
Hereditary peeresses created by Henry VIII
Daughters of British earls
English Anglicans
Executed English women
Executed royalty
People convicted under a bill of attainder
Executions at the Tower of London
Howard family (English aristocracy)
British maids of honour
Pembroke, Anne Boleyn, 1st Marquess of
People executed by Tudor England by decapitation
People executed for adultery
People executed under Henry VIII
People executed under the Tudors for treason against England
People from Sevenoaks District
People from Blickling
Wives of Henry VIII
Year of birth uncertain
16th-century Anglicans
Household of Catherine of Aragon
Court of Francis I of France
Women who experienced pregnancy loss